Malgudi Subha (born 17 October 1965; also spelled as Malgadi Shuba) is an Indian playback singer. She has recorded songs in Tamil, Kannada, Telugu, Malayalam and Hindi. In a career spanning two decades, she sang more than 3000 songs.

She began her career by providing vocals for ad jingles composed by people like A. R. Rahman and Viji Manuel. She debuted as a playback singer in the film Nadodi Thendral, with music by Ilayaraja. Prominent Indian composer A. R. Rahman's debut album, Set Me Free (also called Shubhaa Set Me Free), had all its songs sung by Malgudi Shubha. The album, which was released in 1989 and went unnoticed, but became a good seller when it was re-released in 1996 by the label Magnasound. She sang the song Thayya Thayya in the 1998 Mani Ratnam film Uyire, which was composed by A. R. Rahman.

Her first successful Telugu album, Chikpak Chikbhum, which was released in Chennai, sold ten lakh copies. The songs were composed by Raj–Koti, under whom A. R. Rahman was assisted.

She has appeared as a judge on the Malayalam language music competition program Idea Star Singer. She is a judge in Star Singer 2 (Kannada), airing on Asianet Suvarna from 7-8 pm on weekdays. She is also a judge in the Tamil music competition program Super Singer in Star Vijay.

The South Indian actress Priyamani is her niece and Hindi actress Vidya Balan is her relative.

Discography

Tamil
 "Indha bus than" - Veetla Viseshanga
 "Kaadhal Paattu than" - Nadodi Thendral
"Thaiyya" - Uyire
"Thulluvadho Ilamai" - Sukran
"60 aayiruchu" - Mounam pesiyathey
"Thanni Vechu" - Jai hind

Filmography

As Actress
 Achcham Madam Naanam Payirppu (2022)

References 

 Malgudi Subha Family Details

Living people
Bollywood playback singers
Hindi-language singers
Indian women playback singers
Kannada playback singers
Tamil playback singers
Malayalam playback singers
Marathi-language singers
Russian-language singers
Tamil-language singers
Telugu playback singers
1965 births